Uno Entre Mil (English: One among a thousand) is the third studio album by Mexican pop singer Mijares. This album was released in 1988 earning 3 Gold and 1 platinum discs. It was dedicated to his father.

History
This album was the end of the artistic relationship between the production team of the 1980s: Miguel Blasco, José Ramón Florez, Jesus Glück, Gian Pietro Felisatti… Mijares wanted to evolve, renew his career, and he made it. This album has the Spanish version cover of "Uno su mille" (Uno entre mil) of the Italian singer Gianni Morandi.

Track listing

Lp Album
Tracks :
 Soldado del amor - 3:40
 Un centavo de amor - 3:54
 Como un ladrón - 3:51
 Con un nudo en la garganta - 3:28
 Tan solo - 3:57
 La guerra del amor - 4:20
 Uno entre mil (Uno su mille) - 3:29
 El breve espacio - 4:04
 No quiero perderte - 3:11
 Nube azul - 4:00

Singles
 Soldado del amor
 Uno entre mil
 Tan solo
 El breve espacio

Single charts

Album charts
The album reached the 19th position in Billboard Latin Pop Albums.

1988 albums
Manuel Mijares albums